Jumeirah Hotels and Resorts is an Emirati state-owned luxury hotel chain. The Jumeirah Group was created in 1997 and became part of the Dubai Holding in 2004, which is Sheikh Mohammed bin Rashid al-Maktoum's personal corporate portfolio. Professional golfer Rory McIlroy was the company's global ambassador from 2007 to 2012.

Jumeirah properties 
Jumeirah's activities include management of Wild Wadi Waterpark, spa brand Talise, Jumeirah Restaurants (the company's restaurant division) and runs both The Emirates Academy of Hospitality Management and Jumeirah Hospitality.

Middle East 
Burj Al Arab - Dubai
Madinat Jumeirah - Dubai
Includes Jumeirah Al Qasr, Jumeirah Dar Al Masyaf, Jumeirah Mina A'Salam and Jumeirah Al Naseem
Jumeirah Beach Hotel - Dubai
Jumeirah Zabeel Saray - Palm Jumeirah - Dubai
Jumeirah Marsa Al Arab
Jumeirah Creekside Hotel - Dubai
Jumeirah Emirates Towers Hotel - Dubai
Jumeirah Living Marina Gate - Marina, Dubai
Jumeirah Living World Trade Centre Residences - Dubai
Zabeel House The Greens
Jumeirah at Saadiyat Island Resort - Abu Dhabi
Jumeirah Gulf of Bahrain Resort & Spa - Bahrain
Jumeirah Messilah Beach Hotel & Spa - Kuwait
Jumeirah Muscat Bay - Oman
Jabal Omar Jumeirah - Saudi Arabia

Asia 
Jumeirah Bali
Jumeirah Guangzhou
Jumeirah Maldives Olhahali Island  - Maldives
Jumeirah Nanjing
Jumeirah Himalayas Hotel - Shanghai

Europe 
Capri Palace - Capri
The Carlton Tower - London
Jumeirah Lowndes Hotel - London
Jumeirah Port Soller Hotel & Spa - Mallorca
Le Richemond - Geneva

References

External links 

Companies based in Dubai
Hotel chains in the United Arab Emirates
Hotels in Dubai
Emirati brands
Hotels established in 1997